An ultra wide-angle lens is a lens whose focal length is shorter than that of an average wide-angle lens, providing an even wider view. The term denotes a different range of lenses, relative to the size of the sensor in the camera in question.

 For 1" any 9mm or shorter is considered ultra wide angle.
 For 4/3" any 10 mm or shorter lens is considered ultra wide angle.
 For APS-C any lens shorter than 15 mm.
 For 35mm film or full-frame sensor any lens shorter than 24 mm
 For 6x4.5 cm any lens shorter than 41 mm
 For 6x6 cm and 6x7 cm any lens shorter than 56 mm

Features

'Fisheye' and rectilinear lenses 
Ultra-wide angle lenses come in two varieties: Fisheye lenses with curvilinear barrel distortion, and rectilinear lenses which are designed so that straight lines in the scene will render straight (uncurved) in the photographic image and thus lack the extreme distortion that is characteristic of a fisheye lens. Neither denotes a particular range of focal lengths, the difference is only whether distortion is present or not. However, the shorter the focal length, the more difficult it is to implement rectilinear correction.

In fisheye lenses, the visual angle is close to or more than 180 degrees in at least one direction. For example, a "diagonal fish eye" would have a viewing angle of at least 180 degrees within the diagonals of the frame. A "circular fisheye" would represent the image in the form of a circle.

Rectilinear ultra-wide angle lenses are used in photography and cinematography sometimes to achieve three-dimensional perspective distortion instead of simply two-dimensional barrel distortion. A notable, signature employment for this purpose is frequently seen in the films of Terry Gilliam, for instance.

Larger depth of field (DOF) 
The DOF afforded by an ultra wide-angle lens is very great. Therefore, the photographer has the ability to keep much or almost all of the scene in focus, with respect to the hyperfocal distance of the lens.

Better aperture setting 
Thanks to the small focal length, these lenses can shoot longer exposures without fear of camera shake in the image. (In longer lenses camera shake is multiplied by the zoom factor, but in shorter lenses it is much less apparent). This means that the photographer can afford to use a much smaller aperture if they choose, and still retain a balanced image.

Undesirable objects 
With such a large visual angle, it can be very difficult at times to keep undesired objects such as light sources out of the image. However this does not always pose a problem, as even the sun in a photograph takes up such a small amount of space that its presence can often have little negative impact on the overall composition.

Use of filters 
When using an ultra wide-angle lens, the sky often constitutes a very large portion of the frame, and may need to be darkened for the image to appear balanced. This is often achieved through the use of a gradient filter. Note that a polarizing filter, which also darkens the sky, will often give uneven results when used on an ultra-wide angle lens.

Development 
The oldest "lenses", pinholes, used in pinhole cameras, keep perspective accurately. In images made using this technique, there is little or no distortion due to the rectilinear propagation of light. For a long time it was thought that only symmetrical optical diagrams could ensure the geometrically precise transfer of light without distortion becoming apparent near the edge of images (as the viewing angle increases). However, with modern technology and understanding of optics, ultra wide-angle lenses can these days eliminate distortion almost completely.

Smartphones began incorporating ultra wide angle lens on rear cameras in the mid 2010s. The first models being LG’s G5 and V20 in 2016.

Characteristics 
Longer lenses magnify the subject more, apparently compressing distance and (when focused on the foreground) blurring the background because of their shallower depth of field. Wider lenses tend to magnify distance between objects while allowing greater depth of field.

Another result of using a wide-angle lens is a greater apparent perspective distortion when the camera is not aligned perpendicularly to the subject: parallel lines converge at the same rate as with a normal lens, but converge more due to the wider total field. For example, buildings appear to be falling backwards much more severely when the camera is pointed upward from ground level than they would if photographed with a normal lens at the same distance from the subject, because more of the subject building is visible in the wide-angle shot.

Because different lenses generally require a different camera–subject distance to preserve the size of a subject, changing the angle of view can indirectly distort perspective, changing the apparent relative size of the subject and foreground.

References

Photographic lenses